Charles P. Dykman is a former Presiding Judge of the Wisconsin Court of Appeals.

Career
Dykman was a Judge of the Court of Appeals from 1978 to 2010. He served as a Presiding Judge twice. First, from 1996 to 2001, and second, from 2009 to 2010. Previously, he had been an attorney in the private sector for more than decade. Since his retirement from public service, he has served on the faculty of the University of Wisconsin Law School.

Education
B.S. - University of Wisconsin-Madison
LL.B. - University of Wisconsin Law School

References

Wisconsin Court of Appeals judges
Wisconsin lawyers
University of Wisconsin–Madison alumni
University of Wisconsin Law School alumni
University of Wisconsin Law School faculty
Living people
Year of birth missing (living people)
Place of birth missing (living people)